KZME-FM was a radio station in Portland, Oregon. A playlist and the call sign were broadcast from KQAC's HD2 channel.  KQAC HD2 served as another signal for the station for some time prior to KZME going silent. Notable regular DJs and personnel were Dennise Kowalczyk, James Dineen, Aron Howell and audio engineer David Elkin-Bram.

History
KZME went on the air in the autumn of 2010 and gathered steadily increasing listenership due to its unique music programming.  Most of the programming consisted of local Portland-based and Pacific Northwest original music which found favor with local listeners seeking alternatives to the standard chain-radio fare of most other music-oriented radio stations in the greater Portland area.  Occasional volunteer DJs played music live on the air, with daytime gaps and nights consisting of pre-programmed local music.  Occasional guest DJs, like Dr. Demento (when he appears in Portland each winter), did live shows on the station also. The format of the station leaned toward pop and rock, which dominates daytime programming, but occasionally showcased alternative local music such as electronic, ambient, industrial, rap, ethnic, and experimental music on some evenings and weekends. The station was located in Gresham, Oregon just east of Portland and its transmitter (translator) antenna was located in the west hills of Portland, reaching most of the Portland-area Willamette Valley and to most of greater Vancouver, Washington and Clark County just across the Columbia River. Its former FM stereo broadcasting signal had 28 watts of power. KZME also streamed on the internet. KZME exists in some form on the internet now at "TuneIn Radio"

End of 91.1
KZME went silent on its original 91.1 FM frequency on October 3, 2011, and the station's license expired on October 4, 2012 as a result of remaining dark for more than a year. On February 5, 2014, the KZME call sign was deleted from the FCC database. On August 28, 2014 the KZME programming ended on translator K296FT 107.1 FM, as the translator switched to a simulcast of KXRY 91.1 FM, known as "X-RAY FM".

References

1989 establishments in Oregon
HD Radio stations
Radio stations established in 1989
ZME
Defunct radio stations in the United States
Defunct community radio stations in the United States
2014 disestablishments in Oregon
Radio stations disestablished in 2014
ZME